This is a timeline of the presence of Eastern Orthodoxy in Greece from 33 to 717 AD. The history of Greece traditionally encompasses the study of the Greek people, the areas they ruled historically, as well as the territory now composing the modern state of Greece.

Overview
Christianity was first brought to the geographical area corresponding to modern Greece by the Apostle Paul, although the church's apostolicity also rests upon St. Andrew who preached the gospel in Greece and suffered martyrdom in Patras, Titus, Paul's companion who preached the gospel in Crete where he became bishop, Philip who, according to the tradition, visited and preached in Athens, Luke the Evangelist who was martyred in Thebes, Lazarus of Bethany, Bishop of Kition in Cyprus, and John the Theologian who was exiled on the island of Patmos where he received the Revelation recorded in the last book of the New Testament. In addition, the Theotokos is regarded as having visited the Holy Mountain in 49 AD according to tradition. Thus Greece became the first European area to accept the gospel of Christ. Towards the end of the 2nd century the early apostolic bishoprics had developed into metropolitan sees in the most important cities. Such were the sees of Thessaloniki, Corinth, Nicopolis, Philippi and Athens.

By the 4th century almost the entire Balkan peninsula constituted the Exarchate of Illyricum which was under the jurisdiction of the Bishop of Rome. Illyricum was assigned to the jurisdiction of the Patriarch of Constantinople by the emperor in 732. From then on the Church in Greece remained under Constantinople till the fall of the Byzantine empire to the Ottoman Empire in 1453. As an integral part of the Ecumenical Patriarchate, the church remained under its jurisdiction until Greek independence. Under Ottoman rule, up to "6,000 Greek clergymen, ca. 100 Bishops, and 11 Patriarchs knew the Ottoman sword".

The Greek War of Independence of 1821–28 created an independent southern Greece, but created anomalies in ecclesiastical relations since the Ecumenical Patriarch remained under Ottoman tutelage, and in 1850 the Endemousa Synod in Constantinople declared the Church of Greece autocephalous.

The cultural roots of both Byzantine and modern Greece cannot be separated from Orthodoxy. Therefore, it was natural that in all Greek Constitutions the Orthodox Church was accorded the status of the prevailing religion.

In the 20th century, during much of the period of communism, the Church of Greece saw itself as a guardian of Orthodoxy. It cherishes its place as the cradle of the primitive church and the Greek clergy are still present in the historic places of Istanbul and Jerusalem, and Cyprus. The autocephalous Church of Greece is organised into 81 dioceses, however 35 of these – known as the Metropolises of the New Lands – are nominally under the jurisdiction of the Ecumenical Patriarchate of Constantinople but are administered as part of the Church of Greece; although the dioceses of Crete, the Dodecanese, and Mount Athos are under the direct jurisdiction of the Patriarchate of Constantinople.

The Archbishop of Athens and All Greece presides over both a standing synod of twelve metropolitans (six from the new territories and six from southern Greece), who participate in the synod in rotation and on an annual basis, and a synod of the hierarchy (in which all ruling metropolitans participate), which meets once a year.

The government observes several religious holidays as national holidays including Epiphany, Clean Monday (the start of Great Lent), Good Friday, Easter Sunday, Easter Monday, Holy Spirit Day, the Dormition of the Theotokos and Christmas.

Among the current concerns of the Church of Greece are the Christian response to globalization, to interreligious dialogue, and a common Christian voice within the framework of the European Union.

The population of Greece is 11.4 million (2011), of which 95% to 98% are Greek Orthodox.

The early church in Greece (33–325)

Apostolic era (33–100)

c. 45–46 Apostle Pauls mission to Cyprus, where he converts proconsul Quintus Sergius Paullus.
c. 49 Paul's mission to Philippi, Thessaloniki and Veria; Lydia of Thyatira becomes the first convert to Christianity in Europe after hearing Paul's words in Philippi proclaiming the Gospel of Christ during his second missionary journey.

c. 50–51 Paul's mission to Athens, during his second missionary journey; Metropolis of Corinth founded during Paul's first mission to Corinth; Paul writes his two Epistles to the Thessalonians, from Corinth.
c. 52–53 Hierotheos the Thesmothete, a member of the Athenian Areopagos was converted to Christ by the Apostle Paul and became the first Bishop of Athens, later dying a martyr's death.
c. 54 Paul writes his First Epistle to the Corinthians, during his third missionary journey.
c. 55 Paul writes his Second Epistle to the Corinthians from Illyria Graeca.
c. 56 Paul revisits Macedonia.
c. 60 Crucifixion of Apostle Andrew the First-called, in Patras.
c. 61 Barnabas, founder of Church of Cyprus, traditionally thought to have been martyred in Salamis; Paul's ship lands at Kaloi Limenes (Fair Havens) on the southern coast of Crete, as he was traveling as a prisoner to Rome.
c. 64 Paul ordained the Apostle Titus bishop of Gortyn in Crete, becoming the first Bishop of Crete.
c. 95 Apocalypse of John written on the island of Patmos.
96 Martyrdom of Dionysius the Areopagite of the Seventy.
100 Death of St. John the Theologian in Ephesus.

Ante-Nicene era (100–325)

c. 100–293 During the 2nd and 3rd centuries, Greece was divided into provinces including Achaea, Macedonia, and Moesia.
c. 120 Martyrdom of Eleutherios and his mother Anthia.
124 Apostles Quadratus and Aristides present Christian apologies to Emperor Hadrian at Athens.
c. 130-140 Aquila completes a literal Greek translation of the Old Testament; death of Apostle Quadratus, of the Seventy.
156 Martyrdom of Polycarp of Smyrna.<ref>Great Synaxaristes : Ὁ Ἅγιος Πολύκαρπος ὁ Ἱερομάρτυρας Ἐπίσκοπος Σμύρνης. 23 Φεβρουαρίου. ΜΕΓΑΣ ΣΥΝΑΞΑΡΙΣΤΗΣ.</ref>
c. 170-180 Emergence of the Muratorian Canon in Greek, the first clear witness to a catalog of authoritative New Testament writings.
180–192 Theodotion's Greek translation of the Old Testament.
 180 Death of Pinytus, Bishop of Knossos in Crete, described by Eusebius as one of the foremost ecclesiastical writers of his time.23 October/ 10 October. HOLY TRINITY RUSSIAN ORTHODOX CHURCH (A parish of the Patriarchate of Moscow).
190 Death of Athenagoras of Athens, a Christian apologist who wrote in defense of the resurrection of the dead.
193–211 Symmachus' Greek translation of the Old Testament.Bruce M. Metzger. Theory of the Translation Process. Bibliotheca Sacra 150: 598 (1993): 140–150. (UK: Biblical Studies).
202 Death of Great Martyr Charalambos, Bishop of Magnesia.
210 Hippolytus of Rome, bishop and martyr and last of Greek-speaking fathers in Rome,Great Synaxaristes : Ὁ Ἅγιος Ἱππόλυτος ὁ Ἱερομάρτυρας καὶ οἱ σὺν αὐτῷ Μάρτυρες. 30 Ιανουαρίου. ΜΕΓΑΣ ΣΥΝΑΞΑΡΙΣΤΗΣ. writes Refutation of All Heresies (Philosophumena), and Apostolic Tradition.
c. 215 Death of Clement of Alexandria, who led the Catechetical School of Alexandria and was notable for uniting Greek philosophy and exegesis with Christian doctrine.
c. 250 Matrydom of Christopher of Lycia; martyrdom of Cyprian and Justina at Nicomedia;Hieromartyr Cyprian of Nicomedia. OCA – Feasts and Saints. death of Hieromartyr Leonidas, Bp. of Athens; the earliest known prayer to the Theotokos is recorded on 'Greek Papyrus 470', dated to c. 250 AD.

c. 251 Martyric death of Isidore of Chios under the persecutions of Decius.
262 Great incursion of the Goths into Ionia, Troas, Lydia and Phrygia in Asia Minor.

267 Hordes of Heruli penetrated deep into the Peloponnesus, took Athens, and ravaged Corinth, Sparta and Argos.
270 Death of Gregory the Wonderworker (Thaumaturgus), founder of the Church in Cappadocia.St Gregory the Wonderworker of Neocaesarea. OCA – Feasts and Saints.
286 Death of Marina the Great-Martyr;Great Synaxaristes : Ἡ Ἁγία Μαρίνα ἡ Μεγαλομάρτυς. 17 Ιουλίου. ΜΕΓΑΣ ΣΥΝΑΞΑΡΙΣΤΗΣ. Martyrs Timothy and Mavra.Great Synaxaristes : Οἱ Ἅγιοι Τιμόθεος καὶ Μαύρα οἱ Μάρτυρες. 3 Μαΐου. ΜΕΓΑΣ ΣΥΝΑΞΑΡΙΣΤΗΣ.

293 Emperor Diocletian institutes the Tetrarchy.Southern, Pat. The Roman Empire from Severus to Constantine. New York: Routledge, 2001. p. 145.
302 20,000 Martyrs burned at Nicomedia.Great Synaxaristes  Οἱ Ἅγιοι Δισμύριοι (20.000) Μάρτυρες οἱ ἐν Νικομηδείᾳ καέντες. 28 Δεκεμβρίου. ΜΕΓΑΣ ΣΥΝΑΞΑΡΙΣΤΗΣ.
303 Death of Great-Martyr PanteleimonGreatmartyr and Healer Panteleimon. OCA – Feasts and Saints. and martyrdom of George the Trophy-bearerGreatmartyr, Victory-bearer and Wonderworker George. OCA – Feasts and Saints. at Nicomedia.
304 Death of Virgin-Martyr Anysia of Thessaloniki.Great Synaxaristes : Ἡ Ἁγία Ἀνυσία ἡ Ὁσιομάρτυς. 30 Δεκεμβρίου. ΜΕΓΑΣ ΣΥΝΑΞΑΡΙΣΤΗΣ.
306 Martyric death of Demetrios of Thessaloniki;Holy, Glorious Demetrius the Myrrhgusher of Thessalonica. OCA – Feasts and Saints.
c. 306 Death of Great-Martyr Barbara of Nicomedia;Greatmartyr Barbara at Heliopolis, in Syria. OCA – Feasts and Saints. the Church of the Rotonda in Thessaloniki is built as the "Tomb of Galerius", later converted into a Christian church on the orders of Emperor Constantine I (the Church of Agios Georgios).

306-37 Reign of Emperor Constantine the Great.
311 Edict of Toleration by Galerius officially ending the Diocletian persecution of Christianity; Martyrdom of Bp. Methodius of Olympus.Hieromartyr Methodius the Bishop of Patara. OCA – Feasts and Saints.

313 Edict of Milan issued by Constantine the Great and co-emperor Licinius, officially declaring religious freedom in the Roman Empire.Dr. Kathryn Tsai. A Timeline of Eastern Church History. Divine Ascent Press, Point Reyes Station, CA, 2004. pp.53–54.
314 Council of Ancyra held.
316 Death of Blaise of Sebaste.Hieromartyr Blaise the Bishop of Sebaste. OCA – Feasts and Saints.
319 Matyrdom of Theodore Stratelates ("the General"), under Licinius.Great Synaxaristes : Ὁ Ἅγιος Θεόδωρος ὁ Μεγαλομάρτυρας ὁ Στρατηλάτης. Φεβρουαρίου. ΜΕΓΑΣ ΣΥΝΑΞΑΡΙΣΤΗΣ.
321 Constantine the Great introduced the first civil legislation declaring Sunday a holiday in honor of the Resurrection.
c. 324 The Labarum with the "Chi-Rho" Christogram became the official standard of the Roman Empire, after the final encounter between Roman emperors Constantine I and Licinius at the Battle of Chrysopolis.

Patriarchate of the Roman era (325–732)

Nicene era (325–451)

325 First Ecumenical Council held in Nicea, condemning Arianism, setting the Paschalion, and issuing the first version of the Nicene Creed, also establishing the supremacy of honor of the Apostolic Sees as Rome, followed by Alexandria, Antioch, and Jerusalem.
326 Church of Panagia Ekatontapyliani (Hundred Doors) in Paros founded by St. Helen, during her pilgrimage to the Holy Land.

330 Byzantium refounded as Constantinople / New Rome , Christian capital of the Roman Empire, and is dedicated to the Theotokos by Emperor Constantine.Great Synaxaristes : Μνήμη ἐγκαινίων τῆς Κωνσταντινουπόλεως. 11 Μαΐου. ΜΕΓΑΣ ΣΥΝΑΞΑΡΙΣΤΗΣ.
333 Constantine commissions Eusebius, to prepare 50 copies of the Bible for churches in the new capital.
335 Building of the Protaton church at Karyes (Athos), dedicated to the Dormition of the Virgin Mary, oldest church on Mount Athos.
337 Under Constantine the Great Greece was part of the prefectures of Macedonia and Thrace; death of Constantine the Great, Equal-to-the-Apostles.
c. 337 Death of Bishop Parthenios of Lampsacus.St Parthenius the Bishop of Lampsacus on the Hellespont. OCA – Feasts and Saints.
340–570 Constantinople overtakes Rome as the largest city in the world by population.

c. 342–343 Death of Nicholas of Myra.St Nicholas the Wonderworker and Archbishop of Myra in Lycia. OCA – Feasts and Saints.
346 Apparition of the Sign of the Cross over Jerusalem, in time of Patriarch Cyril, when a luminous Cross appeared over Jerusalem, stretching from Golgotha to the Mount of Olives.

348 Death of Spyridon of Trimythous.St Spyridon the Wonderworker and Bishop of Tremithus. OCA – Feasts and Saints.
c. 354 Emperor Constantius II sent the Arian bishop Theophilos the Indian on mission to south Asia via Arabia where he is said to have converted the Himyarites and built three churches in southwest Arabia; he is also said to have found Christians in India.
357 The Praetorian prefecture of Illyricum is formed when the three dioceses of Macedonia, Dacia and Pannonia were first grouped together by Constantius II.
358 Basil the Great founds monastery of Annesos in Pontus, the model for Eastern monasticism.
359 Councils of Seleucia in the east and Rimini in the west.
360 First church of Hagia Sophia inaugurated by Emperor Constantius II.
364 Council of Laodicea held.

c.368 Basil the Great codifies the ethical precepts of monastic life in his Asketika (sometimes mistranslated as Rules of St. Basil), thus remembered as a father of communal monasticism in Eastern Christianity.
375 Basil the Great writes On the Holy Spirit, confirming the divinity of the Holy Spirit.
377 Epiphanius of Salamis (Cyprus) writes Panarion (Πανάριον, "Medicine Chest"), also known as Adversus Haereses ("Against Heresies"), listing 80 heresies, some of which are not described in any other surviving documents from the time .
378 Visigoths defeat Emperor Valens at the Battle of Adrianople, permanently weakening northern borders of the empire.
379 Death of Basil the Great; the Cappadocian Fathers Basil the Great, Gregory of Nazianzus the Theologian, and Gregory of Nyssa set their mark on all subsequent history of the Greek churches, through Basil's On the Holy Spirit, and Rules; Gregory of Nazianzus' Five Theological Orations; and Gregory of Nyssa's polemical works against various heretical teachings.
380 Christianity established as the official faith of the Roman Empire by Emperor Theodosius the Great.

381 Second Ecumenical Council held in Constantinople, condemning Macedonianism/Pneumatomachianism and Appollinarianism, declaring the divinity of the Holy Spirit, confirming the previous Ecumenical Council, and completing the Nicene-Constantinopolitan Creed.
383 First monastic institution established in Constantinople at Psamathia, outside the city.
386 Panagia Soumela Monastery founded in Trebizond, Pontus, Asia Minor, after St. Luke's Icon of the Mother of God appears at Mt. Mela.
389 Death of Gregory the Theologian.St Gregory the Theologian the Archbishop of Constantinople. OCA – Feasts and Saints.
391-92 Closing of all non-Christian temples in the Empire; Theodosius the Great ends pagan Eleusinian Mysteries by decree.
c. 394 Death of Gregory of Nyssa;Great Synaxaristes : Ὁ Ἅγιος Γρηγόριος Ἐπίσκοπος Νύσσης. 10 Ιανουαρίου. ΜΕΓΑΣ ΣΥΝΑΞΑΡΙΣΤΗΣ.
394 Epiphanius of Salamis (Cyprus) attacks teachings of Origen as heretical.

395 Re-division of Empire with death of Emperor Theodosius the Great, by which time Christianity was definitely the state religion; Theodosius I divided the prefecture of Macedonia into the provinces of Creta, Achaea, Thessalia, Epirus Vetus, Epirus Nova, and Macedonia; the Aegean islands formed the province of Insulae in the prefecture of Asiana; the placing of the cincture (sash) of the Most Holy Theotokos in the Church of the Virgin in Halkoprateia-Constantinople (395–408).The Placing of the Cincture (Sash) of the Most Holy Mother of God. OCA - Lives of the Saints.
398 John Chrysostom becomes Abp. of Constantinople.
399 Death of Evagrius Ponticus, the first monk to write extensively on the spiritual life, recording and systematizing the oral teachings of the desert fathers, and influencing his students Palladius and John Cassian, Maximus the Confessor, Diadochos of Photiki, Isaac of Nineveh, Symeon the New Theologian, and Gregory Palamas, among others.Dr. Kathryn Tsai. A Timeline of Eastern Church History. Divine Ascent Press, Point Reyes Station, CA, 2004. p.77.

403 Synod of the Oak held near Chalcedon, deposing and exiling John Chrysostom, whose principal opponent was Severian of Gabala, who served as prosecutor and judge of the patriarch.
407 Death of John Chrysostom in exile; erection of the  Eudoxiana  in Gaza, a large beautiful church with thirty-two large marble columns, erected at the expense of Empress Eudoxia during the tenure of Bp. Porphyrios of Gaza, and dedicated on Pascha (14 April), 407 AD.
411 Death of Alexios the Man of God, Fool-for-Christ.Venerable Alexis the Man of God. OCA – Feasts and Saints.
420 Death of Bp. Porphyrios of Gaza, known for Christianizing the recalcitrant pagan city of Gaza and having its temples demolished.
421 Emperor of the east Theodosius II declares war on Persia when Persia begins persecuting Christians; the persecution lasts until 457.
425 University of Constantinople founded as the first university in the world.
426 Euthymius the Great establishes lavra in Palestinian desert, consecrated in 428 by Bp. Juvenal of Jerusalem; Synod held in Constantinople against the Messalians.
431 Third Ecumenical Council held in Ephesus, condemning Nestorianism and Pelagianism, confirming the use of the term Theotokos to refer to the Virgin Mary, and confirming autocephaly of Church of Cyprus.
437 Seven Sleepers of Ephesus awakened to prove resurrection of the dead.7 Holy Youths "Seven Sleepers" of Ephesus. OCA – Feasts and Saints.
438 Codex Theodosianus published; relics of John Chrysostom brought to Constantinople and buried in the Church of the Holy Apostles.
447 Earthquake in Constantinople, when a boy was lifted up to heaven and heard the Trisagion; Pope Leo I wrote to the bishops of Sicily, rebuking them for permitting baptism at Epiphany, as the Greeks did, and ordering them to observe the Roman custom of baptizing on Easter and Whitsunday.
449 Robber Synod of Ephesus, presided over by Dioscorus of Alexandria, with an order from the emperor to acquit Eutyches the Monophysite.
c. 450 Revelation of the Life-Giving Font of the Mother of God, in Valoukli, Constantinople, to a soldier named Leo Marcellus (who would later become Byzantine Emperor Leo I (457–474), becoming one of the most important pilgrimage sites in Greek Orthodoxy.April 4/17 . Orthodox Calendar (Pravoslavie.ru).

Early Byzantine era (451–843)

451 Fourth Ecumenical Council meets at Chalcedon, condemning Eutychianism and Monophysitism, affirming doctrine of two perfect and indivisible but distinct natures in Christ, and recognizing Church of Jerusalem as patriarchate.
452 Second finding of the Head of John the Forerunner, at Emesa.Great Synaxaristes : Εὕρεσις Τιμίας κεφαλῆς τοῦ Ἁγίου Προφήτου, προδρόμου καὶ βαπτιστοῦ Ἰωάννη. 24 Φεβρουαρίου. ΜΕΓΑΣ ΣΥΝΑΞΑΡΙΣΤΗΣ.
457 First coronation of Byzantine Emperor by patriarch of Constantinople; Proterius of Alexandria is lynched by an Alexandrian mob; rejecting the Christological definitions of Chalcedon, the Egyptian or Coptic church goes its own way, becoming one of the Oriental Orthodox Churches.
458 Death of Bp. Theodoret of Cyrrhus, influential author and theologian who played a pivotal role in many early Byzantine church controversies.
462 Indiction moved to 1 September; Studion Monastery founded.

463 Death of Patapius of Thebes.Venerable Patapius of Thebes. OCA - Lives of the Saints.
c. 471 Patr. Acacius of Constantinople was first called "Oikoumenikos" (Ecumenical).
476 Fall of the Western Roman Empire as Romulus Augustulus, the last Western Roman emperor, is deposed by the German Odoacer, leaving the emperor in the Greek East as the sole imperial authority, and an unstable political environment in the West where the Church of Rome slowly developed a centralized structure, concentrating religious as well as secular authority in the office of the Pope, the Bishop of Rome.
484 Acacian Schism.
493 Death of Daniel the Stylite an ascetic who lived for 33 years on a pillar near the city of Constantinople.
c. 500 Zosimus, pagan Greek historian writes Historia Nova ("New History"), a history of the Roman Empire to 410 AD, with an anti-Christian view offering a different interpretation to church affairs than from Christian sources; Pseudo-Dionysius the Areopagite's writing corpus including the Divine Names, Mystical Theology, Celestial Hierarchy, and Ecclesiastical Hierarchy influences the development of Byzantine mystical spirituality and hesychasm through Maximus the Confessor, Symeon the New Theologian, and Gregory Palamas.
502 Start of Byzantine-Sassanid Wars, lasting until 562.
518 Patriarch John II of Constantinople is addressed as "Oikoumenikos Patriarches" (Ecumenical Patriarch); the Byzantine government begins persecution of non-Chalcedonians in the east, especially in Mesopotamia.

519 Eastern and Western churches reconciled with end of Acacian Schism.

520 Romanus the Melodist the greatest hymnographer, develops the Kontakion, a chanted verse sermon, to perfection; influenced by Ephrem the Syrian, he in turn influences Andrew of Crete.
529 Emperor Justinian closes the School of Athens, which Plato had founded in 387 BC.
529–534 Justinian's  Corpus Juris Civilis  issued, first comprehensive legal code in history of Roman Empire; Justinian's Novella 131 formulated the proposed government of universal Christendom by five patriarchal sees under the auspices of a single universal empire (Pentarchy).
532 Justinian the Great orders building of Hagia Sophia.
533 Malta becomes part of the Byzantine Empire, being incorporated into the Byzantine province of Sicily for 337 years (533-870).
537 Construction of Hagia Sophia in Constantinople completed; Justinian decrees that all dates must include the Indiction.
537–752 Byzantine Papacy.Eamon Duffy. Saints & Sinners: A History of the Popes. Yale University Press, 1997. pp.72–85.
538 Emperor Justinian the Great, via deportations and force, manages to get all five patriarchates officially into communion.
c. 540 Death of Osios David of Thessaloniki.Monkmartyr David of Thessalonica. OCA – Feasts and Saints.
540 Bulgar raids into Illyricum and northern Greece.
543 Doctrine of apokatastasis condemned by Synod of Constantinople; Justinian the Great sends missionaries to Nubia (the three kingdoms of Nobatia/Novatia, Alodia/Alwa, and Makuria).
544 According to tradition the Mandylion of Edessa destroys Persian siege works.

552 Death of Gregentios of Himyaritia,Sainted Gregory, Bishop of Omiritia (Himyaritia). HOLY TRINITY RUSSIAN ORTHODOX CHURCH (A parish of the Patriarchate of Moscow). missionary Bishop of Himyaritia (Homer, Omirits, in Southern Arabia) for over thirty years, when the area was under Aksumite control, playing an important role in the restoration of Orthodox Christianity there after the persecution of Dunaan (Dhû Nuwâs).
553 Fifth Ecumenical Council held in Constantinople in an attempt to reconcile Chalcedonians with non-Chalcedonians–the Three Chapters of Theodore of Mopsuestia, Theodoret of Cyrrhus, and Ibas of Edessa are condemned for their Nestorianism, and Origen and his writings are also condemned; Ostrogoth kingdom in Italy conquered by the Byzantine Empire after the Battle of Mons Lactarius; the first evidence for a bishop on Malta dates from 553.
556 Completion of Justinian the Great's fortification of Saint Catherine's Monastery; a chapel and anchorites had already been there at least since the 4th century when Egeria visited in c. 385. death of Cyriacus the Anchorite.Venerable Cyriacus the Hermit of Palestine. OCA - Lives of the Saints.
562 Isidorus of Miletus completes repair on dome of Hagia Sophia, now higher by 20 feet than the Anthemian original; re-consecration of Hagia Sophia in Constantinople by Patriarch Eutychius (23 December).
565-566 Completion of the mosaic of the Transfiguration in apse of the Church of the Mother of God on Mt. Sinai.
565-78 The Cherubic Hymn was added to the Divine Liturgy by Emperor Justin II.
566 Bp. Longinus sent from Constantinople to Nubia as missionary.
568 Exarchate of Ravenna established, to 752, a Greek imperial outpost and place of contact with the Latin West.
575 The Chronographia (Χρονογραφία) of John Malalas in 18 books, chronicles the years from creation to 563 AD.
576 Dual hierarchy henceforth in Alexandria, Chalcedonian (Greek) and Monophysite (Coptic).
577 Patr. John III Scholasticus is responsible for the first collection of Canon Law, the Nomocanon, of the Eastern Orthodox Church.
580 Serious invasion of Slavs migrating into the Balkans and Greece; last recorded persecution of pagans in Byzantine Empire.
582 Persecution of Monophysites renewed under emperor Maurice.
586 St. Demetrios of Thessaloniki saves Thessaloniki from Avar-Slav siege.
c. 590 Parthenon in Athens converted into a Christian church dedicated to Agia Sophia.
594 Evagrius Scholasticus writes Ecclesiastical History, covering the years 431 to 594 AD.
602 Final series of wars between Byzantine Empire and Sassanid Empire.
610 Heraclius changes official language of the Empire from Latin to Greek, already the lingua franca of the vast majority of the population.
c. 611 Andreas of Caesarea, Bp. of Caesarea in Cappadocia, writes the first Greek Patristic commentary on the Book of Revelation.Eugenia Scarvelis Constantinou. Andrew of Caesarea and the Apocalypse in the Ancient Church of the East. PhD thesis. Quebec: Université Laval, 2008. 1026 pp. (.pdf)

612 Holy Sponge and Holy Lance brought to Constantinople from Palestine.
617 Persian Army conquers Chalcedon after a long siege.
620 Slavs attack Thessaloniki.
626 Akathist Hymn (Chairetismoi) to the Virgin Mary written, after Constantinople liberated from a siege of 80,000 Avars, Slavs and the Persian fleet. Ακάθιστος Ύμνος. Ορθόδοξος Συναξαριστής. 19 April 2013. – (Εορτάζει 16 ημέρες πριν το Άγιο Πάσχα).
627 Emperor Heraclius decisively defeats Sassanid Persians at Battle of Nineveh, recovering True Cross and breaking power of the Sassanid dynasty.John Julius Norwich. A Short History of Byzantium. Vintage Books, 1997. p. 94. 
630 Second Elevation of the Holy Cross, on 21 March 630 AD,Kaegi, Walter Emil. Heraclius: Emperor of Byzantium. Cambridge University Press, 2003. p. 206. . when Emperor Heraclius entered Jerusalem amidst great rejoicing, and together with Patriarch Zacharios (609–633), transferred the Cross of Christ with great solemnity into the temple of the Resurrection; it is the only time a Byzantine emperor sets foot in the Holy Land.
632 Christian influences on Islamic practice include veiling of women, hospitality for monastic travellers, prostrations, facing east for prayer, fixed hours for daily office of prayer, ritual ablutions before worship.
633 Death of Patr. Modestus of Jerusalem, who had restored many buildings after the Persian sack of 614, including the Rotunda of the Anastasis.Great Synaxaristes : Ὁ Ἅγιος Μοδεστὸς Ἀρχιεπίσκοπος Ἱεροσολύμων. 18 Δεκεμβρίου. ΜΕΓΑΣ ΣΥΝΑΞΑΡΙΣΤΗΣ.
634 Emperor Heraclius issues edict ordering all Jews to be baptized; many Jews flee to protection of Persians or Muslim Arabs.
639 Death of Patr. Sophronius I of Jerusalem, whose poetry and prayers become part of the Liturgy, including the Troparia of the Royal Hours chanted on Great Friday and the eves of the Nativity and Theophany, and the main prayer of Great Blessing of Water on Theophany.
641 St. Christopher of Trebizond heads the Monastery of Panagia Soumela.(641–668).Great Synaxaristes : Οἱ Ὅσιοι Βαρνάβας, Σωφρόνιος καὶ Χριστόφορος. 18 Αυγούστου. ΜΕΓΑΣ ΣΥΝΑΞΑΡΙΣΤΗΣ.
646 Alexandria recaptured by Muslim Arabs after a Byzantine attempt to retake Egypt fails, ending nearly ten centuries of Greco-Roman civilization in Egypt; the monophysite Coptic patriarch Benjamin I and his followers willingly accept Arab rule, preferring it to the Byzantines; Maximus the Confessor takes lead in opposing Monothelitism.
648 Pope Theodore I of Rome excommunicates patriarch Paul II of Constantinople.
649 Arabs invade and conquer Cyprus; the Lateran Council of 649 in Rome definitively condemned Monothelitism, being attended by 105 bishops, of which all but one were from the western portion of the Byzantine Empire.

c. 650 Sicily was flooded with an influx of Greek-speaking refugees from the East, both lay and clerical, from Syria and Egypt, due to a series of convulsions including the Persian invasion of 614, the Muslim conquest of the Levant (634-638), and Emperor Heraclius' persecution of any who spoke out against Monothelitism.
650 The Patriarchate of Constantinople counted 32 metropoles, or capitals of ecclesiastical provinces, 1 autocephalous metropolis, 34 autocephalous archbishoprics, and 352 bishoprics–a grand total of 419 dioceses.
654 Invasion of Rhodes by Arabs.
662 Parthenon in Athens rededicated in honour of the Mother of God as "Panagia Atheniotissa" (Panagia of Athens), becoming the fourth most important pilgrimage site in the Eastern Roman Empire after Constantinople, Ephesus and Thessalonica; death of Maximus the Confessor.
663-668 Syracuse became the imperial seat of Emperor Constans II, and passed to the Greek Rite becoming the Metropolis of the whole Sicilian Orthodox Church.
669-78 First Arab siege of Constantinople; at Battle of Syllaeum Arab fleet destroyed by Byzantines through use of Greek Fire, ending immediate Arab threat to eastern Europe.
680–681 Sixth Ecumenical Council held in Constantinople, condemning Monothelitism and affirming Christology of Maximus the Confessor, affirming that Christ has both a human will and a divine will; Patr. Sergius of Constantinople and Pope Honorius of Rome are both explicitly anathematized for their support of Monothelitism.

685 First monastics come to Mount Athos; emperor Justinian II is the first emperor to have the figure of the Lord Jesus Christ stamped on a coin.
688 Emperor Justinian II and Caliph Abd al-Malik sign treaty neutralizing Cyprus.
692 The "Pentarchy" form of government of universal Christendom by five patriarchal sees received formal ecclesiastical sanction at the Council in Trullo, held in Constantinople, which ranked the five sees as Rome, Constantinople, Alexandria, Antioch, and Jerusalem;

705 Long period of fighting begins between Trebizond in eastern Asia Minor and the Arabs.
706 Greek replaced by Arabic as administrative language in Egypt.
707 Byzantines lose Balearic Islands to Moors;
710 Pope Constantine makes last papal visit to Constantinople before 1967.
712 Death of Andrew of Crete, bishop, theologian, homilist, and hymnographer.St Andrew the Archbishop of Crete. OCA – Feasts and Saints.

 See also 

Eastern Orthodoxy in Greece
Early centers of Christianity
List of archbishops of Athens
Greek Orthodox Church
Eastern Orthodox Church organization
History
History of the Eastern Orthodox Church
History of Eastern Christianity
History of the Eastern Orthodox Church under the Ottoman Empire
History of Eastern Orthodox Churches in the 20th century
Timeline of Eastern Orthodoxy in America
Church Fathers
Apostolic Fathers
Church FathersAnte-Nicene Fathers (book)Desert FathersNicene and Post-Nicene FathersList of Church Fathers

Notes

References

Bibliography
 Rev. Dr. Veselin Kesich. Formation and Struggles: The Birth of the Church AD 33-200. The Church in History Vol. I: Part I. Crestwood, N.Y. : St. Vladimirs Seminary Press, 2007. 
 
 Dr. Larry W. Hurtado. Lord Jesus Christ: Devotion to Jesus in Earliest Christianity. Wm. B. Eerdmans Publishing, 2005. 
 Liebeschuetz, John Hugo Wolfgang Gideon. Barbarians and Bishops: Army, Church, and State in the Age of Arcadius and Chrysostom. Clarendon Press, 1990. 
 Prof. Fergus Millar.  A Greek Roman Empire: Power and Belief under Theodosius II (408–450). University of California Press, 2007.
 Yannis Papadogiannakis. Christianity and Hellenism in the Fifth-Century Greek East: Theodoret's Apologetics against the Greeks in Context. Center for Hellenic Studies. 2013. 194 pp. 
 Steven Runciman. The Byzantine Theocracy. Cambridge University Press, 2004.
 John Meyendorff. The Byzantine Legacy in the Orthodox Church. Crestwood, N.Y. : St. Vladimirs Seminary Press, 1982.
 John Meyendorff. Byzantine Theology: Historical Trends and Doctrinal Themes. 2nd ed. Fordham Univ Press, 1979.
 Timothy S. Miller. Medieval Byzantine Christianity. Ed. by Derek Krueger. A People's History of Christianity, Vol. 3. Minneapolis, Fortress Press. 2006. pp. 252.
 Dimitri Obolensky. The Byzantine Commonwealth: Eastern Europe, 500–1453. New York, NY: Praeger Publishers Inc., 1971.
 Donald Nicol. Church and Society in Byzantium. Cambridge University Press, 2008.
 Fr. Robert F. Taft (S.J.), Patriarch Athenagoras Orthodox Institute. Through Their Own Eyes: Liturgy as the Byzantines Saw It. InterOrthodox Press, 2006. 172pp.
  Ferdinand Gregorovius. Geschichte der Stadt Athen im Mittelalter. Von der Zeit Justinians bis zur türkischen Eroberung. Stuttgart, 1889.
 ("History of Athens in the Middle Ages. From Justinian to the Turkish Conquest." 1889.)
 Prof. Anthony Kaldellis. A Heretical (Orthodox) History of the Parthenon. Department of Greek and Latin, The Ohio State University. 01/02/2007. (.pdf)
 Rev. Dr. Andrew Louth and Dr. Augustine Casiday (Eds.). Byzantine Orthodoxies: Papers from the Thirty-Sixth Spring Symposium of Byzantine Studies, University of Durham, 23–25 March 2002.'' Society for the Promotion of Byzantine Studies, Volume 12. Ashgate Publishing, Ltd., 2006.

Christianity in Roman Greece
Cultural history of Greece
Greek Orthodoxy
Orthodoxy in Greece
History of Eastern Orthodoxy in Greece
Christianity in the Byzantine Empire
Orthodox Church